Asmongold, also known as ZackRawrr, is an American Twitch streamer, YouTuber, content creator,, internet celebrity, and prominent World of Warcraft (WoW) personality. He is widely recognized for his charismatic and engaging personality, his World of Warcraft gameplay, in-depth knowledge and expertise of the game, humorous commentary while playing various MMORPGs, most notably World of Warcraft, and his ability to entertain and engage with his audience. Asmongold's content primarily focuses on World of Warcraft, but he has also branched out to cover other video games and a variety of topics related to gaming culture. Asmongold is a co-founder and co-owner of the popular streaming, gaming, and content creation organization One True King (OTK), based in Austin, Texas, consisting of a variety of online content creators. Asmongold is also a co-owner of Starforge Systems, a  computer company specialized in selling prebuilt gaming PCs.

Early life 

Asmongold was born and raised in Austin, Texas, United States. He grew up with an interest in video games, particularly role-playing games (RPGs), and was introduced to World of Warcraft by a friend in 2006, at the age of 16. He quickly became captivated by the game and started playing it extensively. Asmongold later attended college but dropped out to focus on his streaming career.

Career 
Asmongold began his online career in 2009 by creating YouTube videos about World of Warcraft, in which he shared his insights, strategies, and game knowledge. His YouTube channel experienced steady growth, and he eventually started live-streaming on Twitch in 2011, initially as a hobby, and he began his active streaming career on Twitch in 2014. Asmongold's content mainly consists of gameplay, guides, discussions, and reviews related to World of Warcraft expansions and patches. Ahead of the 2017 announcement of World of Warcraft Classic, he had long wished for and speculated about the game mode's development. His main Twitch account Asmongold was briefly suspended in August 2017 for a comment he made about survivors displaced by Hurricane Katrina which he later addressed in a TwitLonger clarifying his point of view and reached an understanding with Twitch staff.  

His unique style, in-depth knowledge of the game, and entertaining commentary earned him a dedicated fanbase and his dedication to the game and candid personality resonated with viewers, leading to a significant increase in his Twitch following. By 2018, Asmongold had become one of the most popular World of Warcraft streamers on the platform.

Upon the release of Classic in 2019, he surged in overall popularity. He was also one of the platform's most popular World of Warcraft streamers during the 2020 release of Shadowlands. On July 3, 2021, Asmongold started playing Final Fantasy XIV to hundreds of thousands of viewers. In the weeks following, Final Fantasy XIV experienced substantial growth in the number of players and overall popularity. He has maintained his status as a top streamer, even as he diversified his content to cover other games, such as Elden Ring,  New World, and Lost Ark. He returned to Final Fantasy XIV on June 21, 2022.

In 2022, Asmongold started to branch out into more variety style streams. Asmongold has expressed his strong interest in continuing to branch out into creating all the different types of content he enjoys. Asmongold opposes pay-to-win mechanics in video games such as Diablo Immortal. In 2022, he reached out to Republican politician Ted Cruz on the possibility of outlawing loot boxes in video games, claiming that they are a loophole to child gambling laws. Cruz agreed with Asmongold's views and expressed interest in meeting him.

In addition to streaming, in February 2023 Asmongold started co-hosting a weekly podcast called Steak and Eggs, in which he discusses current events and news related to the broader gaming, streaming, and anime communities. The podacst features fellow OTK streamers and content creators, Emiru and Tectone.

In October 2020, Asmongold co-founded One True King, a streaming and content creation organization, with other notable streamers and content creators, including Mizkif, Esfand, and Tips Out. OTK focuses on creating a wide range of content, such as game streams, podcasts, and charity events. In August 2022, Asmongold announced OTK's new PC building company called Starforge Systems in collaboration with fellow content creator Moist Cr1TiKaL. The company was quickly met with backlash due to the allegedly high prices of their products, to which they responded by decreasing their prices by $100.

Philanthropy

Asmongold has used his platform to raise awareness and funds for various charitable organizations and he has participated in numerous charity events and streams, helping to raise funds for various causes. He has hosted numerous charity streams, benefiting a variety of causes. Notably, he raised $380,000 for Games for Love, a charity dedicated to easing suffering, saving lives and creating sustainable futures for children. He also ran a charity stream in cooperation with OTK (One True King), an influencer network and media company built by creators for creators which raised an additional $400,000 for Ukraine.

Personal life
Asmongold is very private about his personal life, but is known for his candidness about his personal struggles with mental health, having suffered from depression and anxiety in the past, and his experiences growing up.

Before beginning his streaming career Asmongold worked for the Internal Revenue Service for two tax seasons in 2012-2013 and later as a Café Associate at Sam's Club for a week. Asmongold also acquired a business degree and was preparing to transfer to a law school, but had to abandon that plan as he was taking care of his mother.

Asmongold briefly dated Pink Sparkles (a variety streamer on the platform at the time) from August 2018-December 2019. In October 2021, his mother died after complications from advanced COPD, leading to his temporary hiatus from streaming.

Legacy

Asmongold has made a significant impact on the World of Warcraft and gaming communities, both as an entertainer and an influential figure. His passion for the game, combined with his extensive knowledge, has inspired countless players to delve deeper into the world of Azeroth. His willingness to discuss a variety of topics related to gaming culture has also contributed to important conversations within the community. Asmongold's influence on the World of Warcraft community has been significant, with his opinions and critiques often sparking discussions and even changes within the game itself. He has been vocal about the state of the game, its mechanics, and the direction of its development, providing feedback that is both constructive and critical. His dedication to the game has contributed to the ongoing dialogue between the developers and the player base, promoting a more inclusive and collaborative environment.

Awards and nominations

References

World of Warcraft players
Twitch (service) streamers
Living people
American esports players
YouTubers from Texas
People from Austin, Texas
Streamer Award winners
1990 births